North Beach is a neighborhood of the city of Miami Beach, Florida.  It is the northernmost section of the city, roughly bound by 63rd Street and Indian Creek Drive to the south and 87th Terrace to the north.  It collectively refers to neighborhoods including Isles of Normandy, Biscayne Point, and La Gorce.

According to the 2013 census, North Beach is home to more than 43,250 people of which 49.9% are foreign born persons. 65.5% speak languages other than English at home. The median household income in North Beach is estimated to be $40,775 between 2009 and 2013.

The total estimated land area of North Beach is estimated to be 4.83 square miles, with a population density of approximately 8,602.2 people per square mile according to the 2010 census.

The Surfside condominium building collapse occurred in the town of Surfside, Florida, just north of this area, on June 24, 2021.

See also
Mid-Beach
South Beach

References

External links

Satellite view on Google Maps

Neighborhoods in Miami Beach, Florida
Populated coastal places in Florida on the Atlantic Ocean